For the Lonely Lest the Wiser is the first EP but second release from Wauconda, Illinois rock outfit Dr Manhattan.  Their first release was a 3 song demo that was given out at a Wauconda High School football game in 2005.  The demo included the songs Claims Should Echo, The Party's Opinion, and Minds Like Ours.

Track listing

To Feel Cozy Surrounded By Wolves 
The track on Dr Manhattan's debut album entitled, To Feel Cozy Surrounded By Cats, and To Feel Cozy Surrounded By Wolves are the same exact track.  The band re-recorded the track and changed the animal from Wolves to Cats.

2006 EPs
Dr Manhattan (band) EPs